The Working Girls is a 1974 sexploitation film written and directed by Stephanie Rothman and starring Sarah Kennedy, Laurie Rose and Cassandra Peterson.

Plot
Three women sharing an apartment in Los Angeles are all endangered by the men in their lives.

Cast
 Sarah Kennedy - Honey
 Laurie Rose - Denise
 Mark Thomas - Nick
 Lynne Guthrie - Jill
 Ken Del Conte - Mike
 Solomon Sturges - Vernon
 Gene Elman - Sidney
 Mary Beth Hughes - Mrs. Borden
 Lou Tiano - Lou
 Cassandra Peterson - Katya
 Bob Schott - Roger

See also
 List of American films of 1974

References

External links

1974 films
1970s English-language films
1974 drama films
American sexploitation films
1974 comedy films
American sex comedy films
1970s sex comedy films
Dimension Pictures films
1970s American films